King's Royal or Kings Royal may refer to:
The Kings Royal, an American band
Kings Royal, a major sprint car event held at Eldora Speedway
King's Royal Rifle Corps, a British Army formation (1755–1958)
King's Royal Hussars, a cavalry regiment of the British Army
King's Royal Regiment of New York, one of the first Loyalist regiments raised in Canada during the American War of Independence
King's Royal, a 1975 novel about the invention of blended whisky in mid-nineteenth century Glasgow by John Quigley
King's Royal (TV serial), A British television drama serial based on the novel